Jacques Muller (born 30 October 1954) was a member of the Senate of France from 20 July 2007 to 13 December 2010, representing the Haut-Rhin department.  He is a member of Europe Écologie–The Greens. He is also the mayor of Wattwiller.

References
Page on the Senate website

1954 births
Living people
Europe Ecology – The Greens politicians
French Senators of the Fifth Republic
Senators of Haut-Rhin
Mayors of places in Grand Est